"Anropar försvunnen" is a song written by Bobby Ljunggren, Robert Uhlmann and Anna-Lena Högdahl, and performed by Hanna Hedlund at Melodifestivalen 2000, where it ended up in eighth place.

The single peaked at number 11 on the Swedish Singles Chart and on 25 March 2000, the song received a Svensktoppen test, but failed to enter the chart.

However the song was popular in Swedish radio, receiving a lot of airplay, and among school-aged children. The song's lyrics are spaceflight-related.

The song was originally intended to be performed by Hanna Hedlund and Linda Bengtzing.

Charts

References

External links
Information at Svensk mediedatabas

2000 singles
2000 songs
Melodifestivalen songs of 2000
Songs written by Bobby Ljunggren
Songs written by Robert Uhlmann (composer)
Swedish-language songs